Fallujah, The Hidden Massacre is a documentary film by Sigfrido Ranucci and Maurizio Torrealta which first aired on Italy's RAI state television network on November 8, 2005. The film documents the use of chemical weapons, particularly the use of incendiary bombs, and alleges indiscriminate use of violence against civilians and children by military forces of the United States of America in the city of Fallujah in Iraq during the Fallujah Offensive of November 2004.

The film's primary themes are:

 Establishing a case for war crimes against civilians committed by the United States.
 Documenting evidence for the use of chemical devices by the US military.
 Documenting other human rights abuses by American forces and their Iraqi counterparts.

White phosphorus 

White phosphorus is a chemical smoke producing agent, reacting quickly and spontaneously with air and causing an instant bank of smoke. As a result, smoke-producing white phosphorus munitions are common, particularly as smoke grenades for infantry, loaded in defensive grenade dischargers on tanks and other armored vehicles, or as part of the ammunition allotment for artillery or mortars. These create smokescreens to mask movement from the enemy, or to mask his fire. WP (white phosphorus) burns fiercely and can set cloth, fuel, ammunition and other combustibles on fire, so it is also used as an incendiary weapon. White phosphorus use is legal for purposes such as illumination and obscuring smoke, and the Chemical Weapons Convention does not list WP in its schedules of chemical weapons.

National Institute for Occupational Safety and Health (NIOSH) gives the following information about white phosphorus. It "spontaneously catches fire in air". Handling requires the most severe level of safety equipment because it is classified as a level 4 hazard, the highest level. When WP comes in contact with skin, it reacts to become phosphoric acid, and continues burning until neutralized. WP causes severe second and third degree burns upon contact with skin or eyes. WP smoke also causes eye and respiratory tract irritation. It not only reacts with skin, but dissolves fat and tissues beneath the skin. When it was used for producing matches, inhalation of the vapors caused a condition known as phossy jaw, where the bones of workers dissolved in their faces.

War crimes
The primary theme of the film is its assertion of a case for war crimes committed by the United States in its military offensive against Fallujah in Iraq. The film documents the use of weapons based on white phosphorus and other substances similar to napalm, such as Mark 77 bomb, by American forces.

Interviews with American ex-military personnel who were involved in the Fallujah offensive testify to the use of the weapons by the United States, while reporters who were stationed in Iraq discuss the American government's attempts to suppress the news by covert means.

Incendiary weapons used against personnel and civilians

The film states that the use of napalm and similar agents was banned by the United Nations in 1980 for use against civilians and also for use against military targets in proximity to civilians.

The use of white phosphorus, as a marker, smokescreen layer or as a weapon, is not banned by Protocol III of the 1980 Convention on Certain Conventional Weapons. What is prohibited is the use of incendiary weapons against targets in close proximity to civilians or civilian property. The protocol specifically excludes weapons whose incendiary effect is secondary, such as smoke and tracer rounds. The United States is among the nations that are parties to the convention but have not signed Protocol III. In the 1990s, the U.S. government condemned Iraqi President Saddam Hussein for allegedly using "white phosphorus chemical weapons" against Kurdish rebels and residents of Irbil and Dohuk.

The March–April 2005 online Field Artillery  magazine has confirmed the use of WP (white phosphorus) in so-called "shake 'n bake" attacks: "WP proved to be an effective and versatile munition. We used it for screening missions at two breeches and, later in the fight, as a potent psychological weapon against the insurgents in trench lines and spider holes when we could not get effects on them with [high explosives (HE)]. We fired "shake and bake" missions at the insurgents, using WP to flush them out and HE to take them out." [P.26]

Graphic visual footage of the WP weapons being fired from helicopters into urban areas is displayed, as well as detailed footage of the remains of those killed by these weapons, including children and women. The filmmakers interview US ex-military support Marine and antiwar activist Jeff Englehart of Colorado who discusses the American use of white phosphorus, nicknamed "Whiskey Pete" (pre-NATO US phonetic alphabet for "WP" - White Phosphorus) by U.S. servicemembers, in built-up areas, and describes the Fallujah offensive as "just a massive killing of Arabs."

Following pressure from former Labour MP Alice Mahon, the British Ministry of Defence confirmed the use of Mark 77 firebombs by US forces during the initial invasion of Iraq.

The Independent said that there were independent reports of civilians from Fallujah suffering burn injuries. One resident said that US forces used "weird bombs that put up smoke like a mushroom cloud" and that he watched "pieces of these bombs explode into large fires that continued to burn on the skin even after people dumped water on the burns". Dahr Jamail, an unembedded reporter who collected the testimony of refugees from Fallujah, spoke to a doctor who had "treated people who had their skin melted".

Indiscriminate violence
The film alleges that the US military indiscriminately targeted Iraqi civilians and children during the Fallujah offensive as part of its campaign to exterminate opposition to its occupation. The film interviews former US Army scout Garret Reppenhagen, also from Colorado, who claims that civilian deaths were common and intentional.

The US military responded by stating that they gave civilians several days of advance warning of the assault and urged them to evacuate the city. This was done through loudspeakers and leaflets dropped by helicopter. However, men of "fighting age" were stopped from leaving the city, numerous women and children also stayed behind, and a correspondent for the Guardian estimated that between 30,000 and 50,000 civilians were still in the city when the assault took place. "The marines treated Falluja as if its only inhabitants were fighters. They levelled thousands of buildings, illegally denied access to the Iraqi Red Crescent and, according to the UN's special rapporteur, used 'hunger and deprivation of water as a weapon of war against the civilian population'."

On November 16, 2005 the Pentagon spokesman Lt. Col. Barry Venable said that "suggestions that U.S. forces targeted civilians with these weapons are simply wrong," but he had to admit to the Financial Times that "it would not be out of the realm of the possible" that civilians were also killed by the white phosphorus.

Criticism

White phosphorus 
Critics of the film point out that white phosphorus is not considered a "chemical weapon" under the Chemical Weapons Convention but an incendiary weapon. Even though it has been used as rat poison, it primarily burns its subject. The Federation of American Scientists (FAS) states that white phosphorus is still used by military powers around the world, even though it states:

Star Wars in Iraq 
A subsequent documentary, Star Wars in Iraq (also by Sigfrido Ranucci and Maurizio Torrealta), accounts for human heads being burned, without their bodies, clothes and nearby equipment suffering damage by the use of US experimental weapons.

These repeated statements that WP was not used against civilians are misleading. The WP shells were fired into the air over the city of Fallujah. With no way to aim or guide the chemicals to a specific target, videos and photographs show the sky above Fallujah filled with exploding white fire which rained down on everything and everyone who happened to be beneath it, despite the US military's own knowledge that a minimum of 30,000 civilians, men, women, and children, were still in the city.

In 2012 a study, released by the Switzerland-based International Journal of Environmental Research and Public Health, showed that in the years following Operation Phantom Fury there had been a 4-fold increase in all cancers, including a 12-fold increases in childhood cancer in those aged 0-14. Nadim al-Hadid, spokesperson of Falluja Hospital declared: "In 2004 the Americans tested all kinds of chemicals and explosive devices on us: thermobaric weapons, white phosphorus, depleted uranium... we have all been laboratory mice for them".

See also
 Sri Lanka's Killing Fields, a 2011 documentary film
 Eyes and Ears of God, a 2012 documentary film

References

Further reading
Peter Popham US forces 'used chemical weapons' during assault on city of Fallujah, The Independent 8 November 2005.
Staff. US 'uses incendiary arms' in Iraq, BBC,  8 November 2005
David Charter  Chemical' rounds used against rebel fighters The Times, November 16, 2005
Philippe Naughton Britain dragged into white phosphorus row The Times Online, November 16, 2005

Italian documentary films
Italian television shows
Documentary films alleging war crimes
Documentary films about the Iraq War
2005 films
2005 documentary films
Fallujah
2005 in Italian television